Akbari Asghari is a 2011 Pakistani comedy drama television series based on Nazir Ahmad Dehlvi's Mirat-ul-Uroos. A modern-day comical adaptation of the novella, was adapted by Faiza Iftikhar and directed by Haissam Hussain. The titular characters were played Sanam Baloch and Humaima Malik who played Akbari and Asghari in the series respectively, with Imran Abbas and Fawad Khan as male leads.

Plot

The story is of two sisters Akbari and Asghari who have spent their whole lives abroad but now their cab driver father wants them to marry his nephews Akbar and Asghar. Akbari is a fake girl who wants to win the hearts of her parents but she also wants to do whatever she wishes. On the other hand, Asghari is not a hypocrite and she does everything publicly.

Akbari is interested in a Christian boy Roger. When Hatim and Kalsoom ask the sisters to marry Akbar and Asghar, Asghari at the spot refuses whereas Akbari agrees just to be in the good-books of parents. When Hatim goes to do shopping of the marriage Akbari plans to escape from the house. She leaves and goes to Roger's where he is found with a girl. He tells her that the girl with him is his wife. Akbari is remained shocked. Kalsoom succeeds in finding her and brings her back.

After this incident Akbari agrees to marry Akbar. But in the village Akbar does not agree to marry Akbari as he wants a religious wife and he thinks his cousins are ultra-modern.

Hatim and Kalsoom bring Akbari to Pakistan. When they see Akbar they are worried because Akbar is very religious. When Akbar tells Asghar that he does not want to marry Akbari, Asghar says that instead of Akbar, he will marry Akbari. Asghar only wants to marry Akbari for money as Hatim has told everyone in Pakistan that he owns much wealth.

When Shaheen and Luqman tell Hatim and Kalsoom about Akbari and Asghar's marriage, they are pleased. Whereas Asghar's cousin and girlfriend Shabbo is angry over him. He lies to her that Akbari has promised to refuse while Nikkah. On the day of dholki, Asghari had to come and attend the wedding. Luqman sends Akbar to bring Asghari from station. Asghari comes home. On the day of marriage, Asghari starts dancing with the dancer which upsets the whole family. Shabbo becomes very upset.

After the marriage, Hatim has a heart-attack so his father tells him to take Akbar to America so that he can take care of Hatim and his business. Akbar goes there and it is revealed to him that the family is poor and they just show that they are rich. In America, Akbar also slowly befriends Asghari but is upset when he sees her with her friend Raj, a Hindu Indian whom he mistakes to be her boyfriend.

On returning to Pakistan, he tells his peer (religious figure) about the relationship between Asghari and Raj and the peer convinces him that to save Asghari from marrying a non-Muslim, he must marry her instead. Though slightly skeptical, Akbar later agrees.

On the other hand, Akbari is shown to be adjusting very badly in her new home. She is rude to her mother-in-law but convinces all the other family members that she is the victim and gains their sympathy. She also shows no interest in Asghar and ignores his advances. The furious Shabbo vows to take revenge on Asghar for betraying her and tries to take every opportunity possible to make it look like he is cheating on Akbari with her.

Akbari also convinces Asghari that she is being treated very badly in Pakistan so that she will convince her parents to force Asghar to divorce her. Asghari, who sees Shabbo and Asghar together is convinced he is cheating on Akbari as well though Akbari remains oblivious to the matter. On receiving the proposal from Akbar, Asghari sees it as an opportunity to be closer to her sister and grant her justice and thus agrees, much to the surprise of her family.

Akbar and Asghari are married in Pakistan but their demeanor towards each other remain somewhat cold, each prejudiced against the other. However they soon grow to like each other though both refuse to acknowledge or show it. Meanwhile, it is shown that Akbar's peer is a fraud and despite the many hints he receives from people he knows, Akbar refuses to hear a word against him.

To show Akbar the truth, Asghari goes to the peer with a problem and on seeing her beauty, he calls her to meet him at night. Meanwhile, Akbari discovers about Asghar and Shabbo and despite her pretense that Asghar means nothing to her, she is deeply hurt. Asghar too is in a fix when he is blackmailed into meeting Shabbo again and again even though he has fallen for his wife. At last, when Shabbo calls him to meet her on the roof, Asghar is saved by his mother, who warns Shabbo to leave her son alone unless she wants the whole family to know about her true colours.

Asghar goes and apologizes to Akbari and confesses his love for her and she too tells him she loves him and goes and thanks and apologizes to her mother-in-law. Asghari is saved by Akbar as the peer tries to harass her when she goes there alone at night. Akbar finally realizes the truth about the fraud and confesses to Asghari that he loves her to which she admits she reciprocates.

Cast

Release

Broadcast
 Akbari Asghari originally aired on Hum TV from May 28, 2011, to 10 November 2011.
 The show reran on Hum TV's sister channel Hum Sitaray premiered 14 January 2016.
 The show was on aired on Hum Europe from 8 May 2016. 
 In 2020, the show was aired on Hum TV under segment "Hum Kahaniyan" from Monday to Friday at 9:00am.
 It also aired in India on Zindagi from 22 June 2015 under the title Aaja Sajna Miliye Juliye to celebrate the channel's first anniversary.

Digital release
 In December 2022, it was made available for streaming on Hum TV's Official YouTube Channel.

References 

2011 Pakistani television series debuts
2011 Pakistani television series endings
Pakistani drama television series
Urdu-language television shows
Hum TV original programming
Pakistani television series endings